The Daewoo Precision Industries K4 is a 40x53mm high-speed Automatic Grenade Launcher in use with the Republic of Korea Armed Forces.

The K4 was developed as a complement to the K-201 hand-held grenade launcher (attachable to the K2).

History
The K4 was first developed in 1994.

Design
It has a weight of 65.9 kg and can fire up to 325 rounds per minute with a firing range of 1.5 km. When needed to be used during night operations, a KAN/TVS-5 night vision scope can be attached onto the receiver.

The K4 is said to visually resemble the Mk 19 AGL.

Users

: Small numbers used by Iraqi special forces on Humvees.
: First export customer, purchased the K4 in 2009.
: Purchased since 2011.
: Several hundred K4s ordered in 2022.

: 17 K4s transferred according to a 2019 SIPRI small arms report.

See also
Mk 19 grenade launcher

References

Automatic grenade launchers
40×53mm grenade launchers
Post–Cold War weapons of South Korea